Trevor Every (19 December 1909 – 20 January 1990) was a Welsh first-class cricketer. A wicketkeeper, he played with Glamorgan from 1929 to 1934.

Every's only first-class century, an innings of 116, was made against Worcestershire in 1932. In opening game of the 1934 season he had trouble picking up the ball and sought an eye specialist. Every was going blind and was forced to retire at the age of 25.

Glamorgan organised an appeal on his behalf, which raised more than a thousand pounds. After losing his sight completely later in 1934, Every trained as a stenographer with the Royal National Institute for the Blind, for whom he worked for many years.

References

External links

1909 births
1990 deaths
Cricketers from Llanelli
Welsh cricketers
Glamorgan cricketers
Wicket-keepers